The 2019–20 Southern Football League season (known as the BetVictor Southern League, following a sponsorship deal with BetVictor) was the 117th in the history of the Southern League since its establishment in 1894. The league has two Premier divisions (Central and South) at step 3 of the National League System (NLS) and two Division One divisions (Central and South) at step 4 of the NLS. These correspond with Levels 7 and 8 of the English football league system. 

As a result of the COVID-19 pandemic, this season's competition was formally abandoned on 26 March 2020, with all results from the season being expunged, and no promotion or relegation taking place to, from, or within the competition. On 30 March 2020, sixty-six non-league clubs sent an open letter to the Football Association requesting that they reconsider their decision. A legal appeal against the decision, funded by South Shields of the Northern Premier League, was dismissed in June 2020.

Premier Division Central

The Premier Division Central consisted of 17 clubs from the previous season, and five new clubs:
Bromsgrove Sporting, promoted from Division One Central
Hednesford Town, transferred from the Northern Premier League Premier Division
Kings Langley, transferred from the Premier Division South
Nuneaton Borough, relegated from the National League North
Peterborough Sports, promoted from Division One Central

League table

Results

Stadia and locations

Premier Division South

The Premier Division South consisted of 17 clubs from the previous season, and five new clubs:
Blackfield & Langley, promoted from Division One South
Hayes & Yeading United, promoted from the Isthmian League Division One South Central
Truro City, relegated from the National League South
Weston-super-Mare, relegated from the National League South
Yate Town, promoted from Division One South

League table

Results

Stadia and locations

Division One Central

Division One Central consisted of 14 clubs from the previous season, and six new clubs.
Relegated from the Premier Division Central:
Bedworth United
Halesowen Town
St Neots Town

Plus:
Biggleswade, promoted from the Spartan South Midlands League
Daventry Town, promoted from the United Counties League
Wantage Town, promoted from the Hellenic League

League table

Results

Stadia and locations

Division One South

Division One South consisted of 16 clubs from the previous season, and four new clubs:
Basingstoke Town, relegated from the Premier Division South
Frome Town, relegated from the Premier Division South
Sholing, promoted from the Wessex League
Willand Rovers, promoted from the Western League

League table

Results

Stadia and locations

See also
 Southern Football League
 2019–20 Isthmian League
 2019–20 Northern Premier League

References

External links
Official website 

Southern Football League seasons
3
Eng
Southern Football League